Buccinulum vittatum is a species of sea snail, a marine gastropod mollusc in the family Buccinidae.

Distribution
This species is endemic to New Zealand. It is found all around New Zealand and as far south as the New Zealand subantarctic islands. The species was first documented in 1833 by Jean René Constant Quoy and Joseph Paul Gaimard.

Taxonomy
Four subspecies were previously recognised but they are currently considered to be taxonomically invalid based on shell morphology and genetic data. B. v. vittatum (the nominate subspecies Buccinulum vittatum vittatum) is found in the northern half of the North Island; B. v. bicinctum is found on the Chatham Islands; B. colensoi is found on the South-East coast of the North island; B. v. littorinoides in Cook Strait, the sub-Antarctic islands and South Island.

Description
The shell of this species is about 25mm in length.

References

 Miller M & Batt G, Reef and Beach Life of New Zealand, William Collins (New Zealand) Ltd, Auckland, New Zealand 1973
 Powell A W B, New Zealand Mollusca, William Collins Publishers Ltd, Auckland, New Zealand 1979 

Buccinidae
Gastropods of New Zealand
Gastropods described in 1833